Christopher Raymond Howland is an Assistant United States Attorney for the state of Delaware.

Early life and education

Howland received his Bachelor of Arts in English from Hendrix College in 2002, his Master's degree in English from the University of Arkansas in 2004 and his Juris Doctor from the University of Pennsylvania in 2010. Howland was a law clerk for Judge Leonard P. Stark on the United States District Court for the District of Delaware from 2010 to 2011 and for Judge Helene White on the United States Court of Appeals for the Sixth Circuit from 2011 to 2012.

Career

Howland was an Associate attorney for Skadden, Arps, Slate, Meagher & Flom from October 2012 to October 2014. In October 2014, Howland became an Assistant United States Attorney for the state of Delaware.  Howland served on the Board of the United States Department of Justice LGBT Pride group. Howland is a Member of the Delaware Lawyer Chapter Board of Directors for the American Constitution Society.

Cases 

In 2019, Howland prosecuted Deborah Vaughn who was found guilty of collecting fraudulent Social Security funds intended for her deceased mother-in-law for more than a decade. Vaughn had a joint bank account with her mother-in-law to collect and withdrew money after she was deceased.

In 2020, he prosecuted Michael Henry who was found guilty of drug and weapons crimes. Henry was on probation following a 2017 sexual assault conviction. Due to that conviction and two former federal gun possession convictions, Henry was prohibited from possessing weapons.

In 2021, he prosecuted Joan Donald, who was a bookkeeper for Dovetail, Inc. She had access to the company's financial account information and was found guilty of using the company's funds over the course of at least seven years to pay for her personal expenses.

In 2021, he prosecuted Susan DiFelice, who was found guilty of defrauding the Social Security Administration (SSA) of more than $200,000. DiFelice was found guilty of collecting fraudulent Social Security benefits over a decade that were intended for a deceased beneficiary, a family friend of DiFelice's.

In 2022, he prosecuted Marques Fountain, who was found guilty of defrauding the Social Security Administration (SSA) of nearly $150,000. Fountain was found guilty of collecting another man's social security retirement benefits after the man died in 2009. Fountain served as the beneficiary's caretaker and continued to deposit the deceased man's retirement benefits into a bank account he controlled.

References

Year of birth missing (living people)
American lawyers
Assistant United States Attorneys